The Gigaductidae are a family of parasites in the phylum Apicomplexa. Species in this family infect Coleoptera (beetles) and Orthoptera (grasshoppers).

History

This family was created in 1948 by Filipponi.

Taxonomy

There is one genus in this family - Gigaductus.  The type species in this family (and genus) is Gigaductus anchi.

Several other species in this family have described and these include Gigaductus aficanus, Gigaductus agoni, Gigaductus americanus and Gigaductus anchi.

Lifecycle

The species in this family are spread by the oral-faecal route.

Development occurs in the epithelial cells of the gut or rarely in the Malpighian tubules.

The gamontocysts are enclosed in a thick gelatinous capsule.

Syzygy and encystment occur in the lumen of the gut (or tubule).

About 25-30 spores are generated from each gametocyst.

References

Apicomplexa families
Parasites of insects